Nikša (Никша) is a given name and a Bosnian/Croatian/Serbian alternative of Nicolas / Nikola. It may refer to:

Nikša Bratoš (born 1959), Bosnian musician who gained fame in former Yugoslavia, member of bands Valentino and Crvena jabuka
Nikša Dobud (born 1985), Croatian water polo player 
Nikša Gligo (born 1946), Croatian musicologist and university professor
Nikša Gradi or Nikola Gradić / Nicoló Gradi (1825–1894), Croatian writer, politician, and lawyer from Dubrovnik
Nikša Kaleb (born 1973), Croatian handball player
Nikša Petrović (born 1992), Croatian football player
Nikša Ranjina or Nicola Ragnina (1494–1582), Croatian writer and noblemen from the Republic of Ragusa (modern-day Dubrovnik)
Nikša Roki (born 1988), Croatian swimmer
Nikša Skelin (born 1978), Croatian rower
Nikša Sviličić (born 1970), Croatian scientist, writer, director and musician

Croatian masculine given names
Serbian masculine given names
Bosnian masculine given names